Samuel Locke (November 23, 1732 – January 15, 1778) was an American Congregational clergyman and educator.

Biography
Samuel Locke was born in Woburn, Massachusetts on November 23, 1732. He was the son of Samuel Locke (1702-1775) and Rebecca (Richardson) Locke Wilder.

He graduated from Harvard College in 1755. 

He was ordained at Sherburne 7 Nov 1759.

He married Mary Porter 2 Jan 1760. Mary was the daughter of Rev. Samuel Porter. Rev. Porter was a predecessor to Rev Locke at Sherburne.

After serving as pastor in Sherborn, Massachusetts, he was appointed president of Harvard University. He held that post from 1770 to 1773, when he resigned. He then returned to Sherborn, where he died of apoplexy.

References

1732 births
1778 deaths
Presidents of Harvard University
18th-century American people
Harvard University alumni